The Encyclopedia of the Third Reich is a two-volume text edited by  and , first published in German in 1985.

The Encyclopedia of the Third Reich is leading source material for information about Nazi Germany and the reign of Adolf Hitler and the Nazi Party between 1933 and 1945. The text covers nearly every major figure, organization, and event during the Nazi era. It does not, however, address the military history of World War II, only the role in which Nazi Germany participated through policies and national directives. The two-volume hardback edition and subsequent one-volume paperback edition include more than 3,000 specific subject entries and over 1,200 "well-chosen illustrations".

It is considered to be a critical text and it can be found at most major American and British universities. The Library Journal review stated it to be "...the definitive reference source for basic data on events in National Socialist Germany. Contributors include some of the former Federal Republic's (West Germany) best young historians".

Notes

Third Reich
History books about Nazi Germany
20th-century encyclopedias